André Daina (born 8 July 1940) is a retired Swiss football referee. He is known for having refereed one match in the 1986 FIFA World Cup in Mexico. He also refereed one match in the 1984 UEFA European Football Championship in France. He refereed a European Cup semi-final leg in 1984 and the European Cup final in 1985.

External links 
 
 
 
  

1940 births
Swiss football referees
FIFA World Cup referees
1986 FIFA World Cup referees
Olympic football referees
Football referees at the 1980 Summer Olympics
Living people
UEFA Euro 1984 referees